Apprentice to Murder is a 1988 thriller film directed by Ralph L. Thomas and starring Donald Sutherland, Chad Lowe and Mia Sara.

Premise 
A teenager (Chad Lowe) is torn between his lover (Mia Sara) and a doctor (Donald Sutherland) of "powwow medicine" in 1920s Pennsylvania.

Cast

Production
The film was developed under the working title of The Long Lost Friend and had its principal photography begin early September, 1986, in Bergen, Norway. According to the September 19, 1986 issue of  Variety, the film had a budget of 10 million dollars and was entirely funded by Norwegian money. Apprentice to Murder was entirely shot in Norway. Production was scheduled to finish early November , 1986, but according to Screen International on November 29, 1986, the film was still filming in Norway. By 1987, Grossman who had been developing another project with his long time friend and Oscar winning screenwriter John Briley (who came to Norway to meet with Grossman's company HOT) convinced Grossman and his director to change the film's title to Apprentice to Murder.

Release
The film was originally set for a November 6, 1987 release. The Daily Variety on December 31, 1987, that the film would have its premiere on January 2, 1988, in York, PA. The New York Daily News stated that Apprentice to Murder was opening on February 27, 1988, in New York while the American Film Institute stated that the film opened in New York and Los Angeles on February 26.

References

External links 

Films directed by Ralph L. Thomas
1988 films
1988 thriller films
American thriller films
Norwegian thriller films
Films shot in Norway
New World Pictures films
1980s American films